The solar eclipse of August 21, 2017, dubbed the "Great American Eclipse" by some media, was a total solar eclipse visible within a band that spanned the contiguous United States from the Pacific to the Atlantic coasts. It was also visible as a partial solar eclipse from as far north as Nunavut in northern Canada to as far south as northern South America. In northwestern Europe and Africa, it was partially visible in the late evening. In northeastern Asia, it was partially visible at sunrise.

Prior to this event, no solar eclipse had been visible across the entirety of the United States since June 8, 1918; not since the February 1979 eclipse had a total eclipse been visible from anywhere in the mainland United States. The path of totality touched 14 states, and the rest of the U.S. had a partial eclipse. The area of the path of totality was about 16 percent of the area of the United States, with most of this area over the ocean, not land. The event's shadow began to cover land on the Oregon coast as a partial eclipse at 4:05 p.m. UTC (9:05 a.m. PDT), with the total eclipse beginning there at 5:16 p.m. UTC (10:16 a.m. PDT); the total eclipse's land coverage ended along the South Carolina coast at about 6:44 p.m. UTC (2:44 p.m. EDT). Visibility as a partial eclipse in Honolulu, Hawaii began with sunrise at 4:20 p.m. UTC (6:20 a.m. HST) and ended by 5:25 p.m. UTC (7:25 a.m. HST).

This total solar eclipse marked the first such event in the smartphone and social media era in America. Information, personal communication, and photography were widely available as never before, capturing popular attention and enhancing the social experience.
The event was received with much enthusiasm across the nation; people gathered outside their homes to watch it, and many parties were set up in the path of the eclipse.  Many people left their homes and traveled hundreds of miles just to get a glimpse of totality, which few ever get to experience.  Marriage proposals were timed to coincide with the eclipse, as was at least one wedding. Logistical problems arose with the influx of visitors, especially for smaller communities.  The sale of counterfeit eclipse glasses was also anticipated to be a hazard for eye injuries.

Future total solar eclipses will cross the United States on April 8, 2024 (12 states), August 23, 2044 (2 states), and in August 12, 2045 (10 states), and annular solar eclipses—wherein the Moon appears smaller than the Sun—will occur in October 2023 (9 states) and June 2048 (9 states).

Visibility

It was first seen from land in the U.S. shortly after 10:15 am PDT (17:15 UTC) at Oregon's Pacific coast, and then it progressed eastward through Salem, Oregon; Idaho Falls, Idaho; Casper, Wyoming; Lincoln, Nebraska; Kansas City, Missouri; St. Louis, Missouri; Hopkinsville, Kentucky; and Nashville, Tennessee; before reaching Columbia, South Carolina about 2:41 pm; and finally Charleston, South Carolina. A partial eclipse was seen for a greater time period, beginning shortly after 9:00 am PDT along the Pacific Coast of Oregon. Weather forecasts predicted clear skies in Western U.S. and some Eastern states, but clouds in the Midwest and East Coast.

This was the first total solar eclipse visible from the Southeastern United States since the solar eclipse of March 7, 1970. Two NASA WB-57Fs flew above the clouds, prolonging the observation time spent in the umbra. A partial solar eclipse was seen from the much broader path of the Moon's penumbra, including all of North America, particularly areas just south of the totality pass, where the eclipse lasted about 3–5 hours, northern South America, Western Europe, and some of Africa and north-east Asia.

At one location in Wyoming, a small group of astronomers used telescopic lenses to photograph the sun as it was in partial eclipse, while the International Space Station was also seen to briefly transit the sun. Similar images were captured by NASA from a location in Washington. (See Gallery – partial eclipse section).

Other celestial bodies

During the eclipse for a long span of its path of totality, several bright stars and four planets were visible. The star system Regulus was almost in conjunction with the Sun. Mars was 8° to the right, and Venus 34° right. Mercury was 10° left, and Jupiter 51° left.

Other eclipses over the United States
This was the first total solar eclipse visible from the United States since that of July 11, 1991—which was seen only from part of Hawaii—and the first visible from the contiguous United States since 1979. An eclipse of comparable length (up to 3 minutes, 8 seconds, with the longest eclipse being 6 minutes and 54 seconds) occurred over the contiguous United States on March 7, 1970 along the southern portions of the Eastern Seaboard, from Florida to Virginia.

The path of totality of the solar eclipse of February 26, 1979 crossed only the states of Washington, Oregon, Idaho, Montana, and North Dakota. Many enthusiasts traveled to the Pacific Northwest to view the eclipse, since it would be the last chance to view such an eclipse in the contiguous United States for almost four decades.

The August 2017 eclipse was the first with a path of totality crossing the Pacific and Atlantic coasts of the U.S. since 1918. Also, its path of totality made landfall exclusively within the United States, making it the first such eclipse since the country's declaration of independence in 1776. Prior to this, the path of totality of the eclipse of June 13, 1257, was the last to make landfall exclusively on lands currently part of the United States.

The path of the 2017 eclipse crosses with the path of the upcoming total solar eclipse of April 8, 2024, with the intersection of the two paths being in southern Illinois in Makanda Township at Cedar Lake, just south of Carbondale. The cities of Benton, Carbondale, Chester, Harrisburg, Marion, and Metropolis in Illinois; Cape Girardeau, Farmington, and Perryville in Missouri, as well as Paducah, Kentucky, will also be in the path of the 2024 eclipse, thereby earning the distinction of witnessing two total solar eclipses in seven years.

The solar eclipse of August 12, 2045 will have a very similar path of totality over the U.S. to the 2017 eclipse: about 400 km (250 mi) to the southwest, also crossing the Pacific and Atlantic coasts of the country; however, totality will be more than twice as long and it will be seen not only in the United States. It will be seen in the Americas.

Total eclipse viewing events

Oregon

 Corvallis – The Corvallis campus of Oregon State University hosted "OSU150 Space Grant Festival: A Total Eclipse Experience", a weekend-long celebration of the eclipse. A watch party was also hosted on campus the day of the eclipse.
 Huntington – Historic Farewell Bend State Recreation Area hosted the RASC: Yukon Centre (Yukon Astronomical Society) and the RASC: Okanagan Centre. Solar viewing and presentations on the eclipse were given along with a dark-sky presentation.
 Keizer – The Salem-Keizer Volcanoes, a Class A baseball team, played a morning game against the visiting Hillsboro Hops that featured the first ever "eclipse delay" in baseball history.
 Madras – The city sponsored a four-day Solarfest at two locations.
 Ontario – Treasure Valley Community College hosted an eclipse viewing event.
 Prineville – Symbiosis Gathering hosted a seven-day eclipse festival which included rave-style music dubbed "Oregon Eclipse".
 Rickreall – The Polk County Fairgrounds organized a series of events and an eclipse gathering.
 Salem – The Oregon Museum of Science and Industry hosted an event at the Oregon State Fairgrounds.

Idaho

Arco – High altitude balloon launches by the USC Astronautical Engineering department and NASA.
 Craters of the Moon – The National Monument and Preserve hosted NASA presentations, evening star parties hosted by the Idaho Falls Astronomical Society, and presentations by the New Mexico Chapter of the Charlie Bates Solar Astronomy Project.
 Idaho Falls – Free entertainment and educational seminars and an eclipse-watching event at the Museum of Idaho (an official NASA viewing site) and elsewhere, and a free eclipse-watching event at Melaleuca Field.
 Rexburg – Brigham Young University Idaho offered a series of eclipse-related educational events.
 Weiser – The city sponsored a five-day festival prior to the eclipse.

Wyoming

 Casper – The Astronomical League, an alliance of amateur astronomy clubs, held its annual Astrocon conference, and there were other public events, called Wyoming Eclipse Festival 2017.
Fort Laramie – Fort Laramie held an eclipse viewing event, which included a Special "Great American Eclipse" Program.
Riverton – The biggest Polish expedition conducted as the Great Expedition of Polish Society of Amateur Astronomers was flocked between Riverton and Shoshoni in the central line of totality.

Nebraska

 Alliance – Entertainment and educational seminars were offered. ABC News reported live from Carhenge during totality.
 Auburn – Nemaha County Hospital hosted an eclipse viewing event, including sharing safety tips from Lifetime Vision Center.
 Beatrice – Homestead National Monument of America – Events were held with Bill Nye the Science Guy as well as representatives from NASA on Saturday, Sunday and the day of the eclipse.
 Grand Island – Stuhr Museum hosted an eclipse viewing event, including the launch of a NASA eclipse observing balloon.
 Lincoln – At Haymarket Park, the Lincoln Saltdogs, an independent baseball team in the American Association, defeated the Gary SouthShore RailCats 8–5 in a special eclipse game, with 6,956 in attendance. The game was paused for 26 minutes in the middle of the third inning to observe the eclipse. The Saltdogs players wore special eclipse-themed uniforms that were auctioned off after the game.

Kansas
 Atchison – Benedictine College hosted thousands in its football stadium. There were students from schools from Kansas, Missouri, Nebraska, and Oklahoma attending, plus numerous other guests who heard from, amongst others, astronomers from the Vatican Observatory.

Missouri
 Columbia – The Cosmo Park and the Gans Creek Park were open for the eclipse. There was a watch party on campus for the students of the University of Missouri coordinated by Angela Speck, and the MU Health Care system released eye safety information.
 Kansas City – A 5-mile (8 km) bicycle ride from downtown KCMO (where totality only lasted about 30 seconds) to Macken Park in North Kansas City (where totality lasted 1 minute 13 seconds) was organized by KC Pedal Party Club, a local Meetup group.
 Lathrop – The city celebrated its 150th anniversary with an eclipse festival.
 Parkville – TotalEclipseofthePark – August 20 educational program featuring NASA Glenn Research Center Hall of Famer Lynn Bondurant, '61, and August 21 watch party organized by Park University.
 Potosi  – Hora Eclipse, an Israeli folkdance camp coordinated with the eclipse, was held at YMCA Trout Lodge and Camp Lakewood, near the Mark Twain National Forest. More information at the event's website, especially its post-mortem page.
 St. Clair – An event organized by the St. Clair City Chamber of Commerce.
 St. Joseph – An event organized by Front Page Science was held at Rosecrans Memorial Airport.
 St. Louis – David Tipper hosted his Tipper & Friends 4321 electronic music event at Astral Valley Art Park featuring 5 days of music, art, and eclipse viewing.

Illinois

 Carbondale – Southern Illinois University sponsored many eclipse related educational events, including the two day Crossroads Astronomy, Science and Technology Expo, and viewing at Saluki Stadium. Amtrak ran a special train, the Eclipse Express, from Chicago to Carbondale. NASA EDGE was broadcasting live from Southern Illinois University Carbondale with a four-hour and thirty-minute show (11:45 a.m. – 4:15 p.m. EDT).
 Carterville – A three-day rock festival called Moonstock was headlined by Ozzy Osbourne, who performed during the eclipse.
 Goreville – The University of Illinois Astronomy Department hosted a viewing event in town, which was the closest village to the point of longest duration.

Kentucky

 Bowling Green – Western Kentucky University hosted thousands of K-12 students in its football stadium. At Bowling Green Ballpark, the Bowling Green Hot Rods, a Class A baseball team, played an eclipse game against the visiting West Michigan Whitecaps.
 Hopkinsville – A four-day eclipse festival was held at Jefferson Davis State Historic Site.

Tennessee

 Athens – The City of Athens hosted "Total Eclipse of the Park" at Athens Regional Park, including entertainment, food, and vendors.
 Clarksville – Austin Peay State University presented several educational events, including an appearance by astronaut Rhea Seddon.
 Cookeville – Tennessee Technological University hosted a solar eclipse viewing party at Tucker Stadium. Cookeville hosted special events from Saturday to Monday.
 McMinnville – celebrated the eclipse by hosting BLACKOUT 2017, an eclipse viewing event held in the city square. In addition to the viewing, a selection of food trucks and musical acts which features The Pink Floyd Appreciation Society band who performed Pink Floyd's The Dark Side of the Moon in its entirety prior to the totality event.
 Memphis – At AutoZone Park, the Memphis Redbirds, a Class AAA baseball team, played an eclipse game against the visiting New Orleans Baby Cakes.
 Nashville – offered many special events, including the Music City Eclipse Science & Technology Festival at the Adventure Science Center. The Italian Lights Festival hosted the largest Eclipse Viewing Party in Nashville, a free NASA-Certified Eclipse Event held at the Bicentennial Mall. Two astrophysicists from NASA's Jet Propulsion Laboratory emceed the countdown.

North Carolina
 Bryson City – Planetarium shows were offered, as well as rides on the Great Smoky Mountains Railroad to an eclipse location.
 Cullowhee – The eclipse was visible in totality, and classes were cancelled for several hours during the first day of classes at Western Carolina University.
 Rosman – Pisgah Astronomical Research Institute (PARI) hosted a viewing event. The event at PARI has garnered international attention and the visitors included amateur astronomers.

Georgia
 Athens – Viewing at Sanford Stadium at the University of Georgia.
 Blairsville – Get off the Grid Festival on three days preceding the eclipse.
 Elbert County – Approximately 400 people gathered at the Georgia Guidestones.

South Carolina
 Anderson – Viewing at the Green Pond Landing on Lake Hartwell with food trucks, astronomer, and music. Unfortunately clouds blocked the sun at the beginning of totality, but almost completely disappeared throughout.
 Charleston – The College of Charleston hosted NASA's "eclipse headquarters" broadcast as part of an afternoon eclipse viewing celebration on the green behind the campus library.
 Clemson – Viewing at Clemson University.
 Columbia – The South Carolina State Museum hosted four days of educational events, including an appearance by Apollo 16 astronaut Charles Duke. At Spirit Communications Park, the Columbia Fireflies, a Class A baseball team, played an eclipse game against the visiting Rome Braves.
 Greenville – Viewing at Furman University. Events include streaming coverage from NASA, educational activities, and live music. At Fluor Field, the Greenville Drive, a Class A baseball team, played an eclipse game against the visiting West Virginia Power.
 Sumter – Viewing at Dillon Park. Eclipse viewing glasses given away for free.
 Goose Creek – The clouds blocked the Eclipse that day much like in Anderson.

Viewing from outside the United States

Canada
A partial eclipse was visible across the width of Canada, ranging from 89 percent in Victoria, British Columbia to 11 percent in Resolute, Nunavut. In Ottawa, viewing parties were held at the Canada Aviation and Space Museum. In Toronto, viewing parties were held at the CNE and the Ontario Science Centre.

Mexico, Central America, Caribbean islands, South America
A partial eclipse was visible from Central America, Mexico, the Caribbean islands, and ships and aircraft in and above the adjacent oceans, as well as the northern countries of South America such as Colombia, Venezuela, and several others.

On the Caribbean Sea, Bonnie Tyler performed her 1983 song Total Eclipse of the Heart live with the pop group DNCE on board the cruise ship Oasis of the Seas, as the ship entered the eclipse's totality path, east of The Bahamas.

Asian Russia
A partial eclipse was visible during sunrise or morning hours in Russian Far East (including Severnaya Zemlya and New Siberian Islands archipelagos). For big cities in Russia, the maximal obscuration was in Anadyr, and it was 27.82%.

Europe
In northwestern Europe, a partial eclipse was visible in the evening or at sunset. Only those in Iceland, Ireland, Scotland and the Portuguese Azores archipelago saw the eclipse from beginning to end; in Wales, England, Norway, the Netherlands, Belgium, France, Spain, and Portugal, sunset occurred before the end of the eclipse. In Germany, the beginning of the eclipse was visible just at sunset only in the extreme northwest of the country. In all regions east of the orange line on the map, the eclipse was not visible.

West Africa
In some locations in West Africa and western North Africa, a partial eclipse was seen just before and during sunset. The most favorable conditions to see this eclipse gained the Cape Verde Archipelago with nearly 0.9 magnitude at the Pico del Fogo volcano.

Media and scientific coverage

A large number of media outlets broadcast coverage of the eclipse, including television and internet outlets. NASA announced plans to offer streaming coverage through its NASA TV and NASA Edge outlets, using cameras stationed on the ground along the path of totality, along with cameras on high-altitude balloons, jets, and coverage from the International Space Station; NASA stated that "never before will a celestial event be viewed by so many and explored from so many vantage points—from space, from the air, and from the ground." ABC, CBS, and NBC announced that they would respectively broadcast live television specials to cover the eclipse with correspondents stationed across the path of totality, along with CNN, Fox News Channel, Science, and The Weather Channel. The PBS series Nova presented streaming coverage on Facebook hosted by Miles O'Brien, and aired a special episode chronicling the event—"Eclipse Over America"—later in the day (which marked the fastest production turnaround time in Nova history).

Other institutions and services also announced plans to stream their perspectives of the eclipse, including the Exploratorium in San Francisco, the Elephant Sanctuary of Hohenwald, Tennessee, the Slooh robotic telescope app, and The Virtual Telescope Project. The Eclipse Ballooning Project, a consortium of schools and colleges that sent 50 high-altitude balloons into the sky during the eclipse to conduct experiments, provided streams of footage and GPS tracking of its launches.

The National Solar Observatory organized Citizen CATE volunteers to man 60 identical telescopes and instrumentation packages along the totality path to study changes in the corona over the duration of the eclipse.

In orbit, the satellites Lunar Reconnaissance Orbiter, the International Space Station, the Solar Dynamics Observatory, the Moderate Resolution Imaging Spectroradiometer, Solar and Heliospheric Observatory, and Hinode gathered data from the eclipse.

A viewing party was held at the White House, during which President Donald Trump appeared on the Truman Balcony with First Lady Melania Trump. With the sun partially eclipsed, President Trump looked briefly in the general direction of the sun before using solar viewing glasses.

The eclipse generated reports of abnormal behavior in animal and plant life. Some chickens came out from beneath their coops and began grooming, usually an evening activity. Horses displayed increased whinnying, running, and jumping after the event. Cicadas were reported to grow louder before going silent during totality. Various birds were also observed flying in unusually large formations. Flowers such as the Hibiscus closed their petals which typically happens at night, before opening again after the solar event.

Pornhub, a pornographic video-sharing website provided an unusual sociological and statistical report: its traffic dropped precipitously along the path of totality, so much so that its researchers were themselves surprised.

NASA reported over 90 million page views of the eclipse on its websites, making it the agency's biggest online event ever, beating the previous web traffic record about seven times over.

Counterfeit eclipse glasses

In the months leading up to the eclipse, many counterfeit glasses were put up for sale. Effective eclipse glasses must not only block most visible light, but most UV and infrared light as well. For visible light, the user should only be able to see the Sun, sunglint reflected off shiny metal, halogen bulbs, the filament in unfrosted incandescent bulbs, and similarly intense sources. Determining whether the glasses effectively block enough UV and infrared light requires the use of spectrophotometer, which is a rather expensive piece of lab equipment.

The eye's retina lacks pain receptors, and thus damage can occur without one's awareness.

The American Astronomical Society (AAS) said products meeting the ISO 12312-2 standard avoid risk to one's eyes, and issued a list of reputable vendors of eclipse glasses. The organization warned against products claiming ISO certification or even citing the same number, but not tested by an accredited laboratory. Another problem was counterfeits of reputable vendors' products, some even claiming the company's name such as with American Paper Optics which published information detailing the differences between its glasses and counterfeits.

Andrew Lund, the owner of a company which produces eclipse glasses, noted that not all counterfeit glasses were necessarily unsafe. He stated to Quartz that the counterfeits he tested blocked the majority of harmful light spectrum, concluding that "the IP is getting ripped off, but the good news is there are no long-term harmful effects." As one example, the Springdale Library in metropolitan Pittsburgh, Pennsylvania, accidentally passed out dozens of pairs of counterfeit eclipse glasses, but as of August 23 had not received any reports of eye damage.

On July 27, 2017, Amazon required all eclipse viewing products sold on its website have a submission of origin and safety information, and proof of an accredited ISO certification. In mid-August 2017, Amazon recalled and pulled listings for eclipse viewing glasses that "may not comply with industry standards", and gave refunds to customers who had purchased them.

Camera equipment damage
Lensrentals, a camera rental company based in Tennessee, reported that many of its customers returned cameras and lenses with extensive damage. The most common problem reported was damage to the camera's sensor. This most often happens when shooting in live view mode, where the sensor is continuously exposed to the eclipse image and becomes damaged by the sun's light. Another problem was the heat and brightness of the eclipse destroying the lens iris, which mechanically regulates the amount of light that enters the camera. Another problem reported was one of a cinema camera's neutral-density filter being damaged by the heat and light of the eclipse. The cost of all of this damage likely amounted to thousands of dollars.

Planning

Officials inside and near the path of totality plannedsometimes for yearsfor the sudden influx of people. Smaller towns struggled to arrange viewing sites and logistics for what could have been a tourism boom or a disaster.

In the American West, illegal camping was a major concern, including near cities like Jackson Hole, Wyoming. The state anticipated up to 500,000 visitors to join its 1.6 million residents.

Oregon deployed six National Guard aircraft and 150 soldiers because the influx of visitors coincided with the state's fire season. Hospital staffing, and supplies of blood and antisnake bite antidote, were augmented along the totality line.

Also in Oregon, there were reports of hoteliers canceling existing reservations made at the regular market rate and increasing their rate, sometimes threefold or more, for guests staying to view the eclipse. The Oregon Department of Justice (DOJ) investigated various complaints and reached settlements with affected customers of at least 10 hotels in the state. These settlements included refunds to the customers and fines paid to the DOJ.

Post-eclipse traffic problems

Although traffic to areas within the path of totality was somewhat spread out over the days prior to the eclipse, there were widespread traffic problems across the United States after the event ended. Michael Zeiler, an eclipse cartographer, had estimated that between 1.85 million and 7.4 million people would travel to the path of the eclipse.

In Oregon, because an estimated one million people were expected to arrive, the Oregon National Guard was called in to help manage traffic in Madras along US 26 and US 97. Madras Municipal Airport received more than 400 mostly personal planes that queued for hours while waiting to leave after the eclipse.

Officials in Idaho, where the totality path crossed the center of the state, began planning for the eclipse a year in advance. The Idaho State Police (ISP) stationed a patrol car along I-15 every  between Shelley and the Utah border.

After the eclipse, traffic more than doubled along I-15 southbound, with extensive traffic jams continuing for eight hours as viewers who had traveled north into the totality path from Utah returned there and to points south. The ISP tweeted a picture of bumper-to-bumper traffic stalled on the interstate just south of Idaho Falls. Others reported that it took three hours to travel from Idaho Falls to the closer city of Blackfoot,  farther north of Pocatello.

In the rest of the state the impact was less severe. Traffic nearly doubled on US 93, and was up 55 percent on US 20.

For some northbound travelers on I-15, the Montana Department of Transportation had failed to make similar plans to those in Idaho, scheduling a road construction project to begin on August 21 that narrowed a section of the highway to a single northbound lane, near the exit to Clark Canyon Dam south of Dillon. Though that stretch of highway generally has a traffic count of less than 1,000 vehicles per day, on the day of the eclipse there were over a thousand vehicles per hour at peak times. As a result, traffic backed up as far as Lima, creating a delay of at least an hour for travelers heading northward. Further, as construction had not yet begun, drivers observed cones set up but no workers present on the road. While the state traditionally halts construction projects during high traffic periods, a state official admitted "we ... probably made a bad mistake here in this regard."

In Wyoming, estimates were that the population of the state, officially 585,000, may have doubled or even tripled, with traffic counts on August 21 showing 536,000 more cars than the five-year average for the third Monday in August; a 68 percent increase. One official offered an estimate of "two people in every car" to arrive at a one-million-visitor figure, and others noted that one million was a conservative estimate based on a one-day traffic count of limited portions of major highways.  There were additional arrivals by aircraft, plus travelers who arrived early or stayed for additional days. Two days before the eclipse, traffic increased 18 percent over a five-year average, with an additional 131,000 vehicles on the road. Sunday saw an additional 217,000-vehicle increase.

Following the eclipse, more than 500,000 vehicles traveled Wyoming roads, creating large traffic jams, particularly on southbound and eastbound highways. Drivers reported that it took up to 10 hours to travel  into northern Colorado. There was one traffic fatality, and another fatality related to an off-highway ATV accident, but in general there were far fewer incidents and traffic citations than authorities had anticipated.

In Tennessee, the Knoxville News Sentinel described the traffic problems created by the eclipse as the worst ever seen in that part of the state. One backup along Interstate 75 reached  in length, between Niota and the Interstate 40 interchange at Farragut. A spokesman for the state's Department of Transportation allowed that the traffic jams were the worst he had seen in six and a half years on the job, noting that accidents had aggravated the already heavy traffic flows, attributed the I-75 congestion to Knoxville-area residents heading for the totality path at Sweetwater and returning during what was the city's normal afternoon rush hour.

Before the eclipse, state officials had described their traffic expectations as equivalent to that generated by the Bonnaroo Music Festival, the twice-a-season NASCAR Cup Series races at Bristol or the formerly-held Boomsday fireworks festival. "Maybe they should have considered a tsunami of traffic combining all three of those heavily attended events", the News Sentinel commented. The Tennessee Highway Patrol made sure that "[e]very trooper not on sick leave or military leave or pre-approved leave [wa]s working" the day of the eclipse; the state DOT made sure its full complement of emergency-aid HELP trucks were available as well. Alert signs on the highways also warned motorists not to pull over onto the shoulders to watch the eclipse as it could increase the risk of dangerous accidents and block the path of emergency vehicles.

In North Carolina, the Department of Transportation added cameras, message boards and safety patrols in the counties where the total eclipse would take place, as well as stopping road work. The department warned that due to "unprecedented" traffic ordinary activities requiring driving might prove difficult, and advised people to act as if there were snow.

In Kentucky, particularly around the Hopkinsville area, which was dubbed "Eclipseville, USA", post-eclipse traffic caused extensive delays. The en masse departure of tourists via Interstate 69 as well as the Western Kentucky Parkway resulted in commute times double or even triple of normal.  The Hopkinsville-to-Lexington commute under normal circumstances lasts three and a half hours.

Impact on solar power

An eclipse causes a reduction of solar power generation where the Moon shadow covers any solar panel, as do clouds.

The North American Electric Reliability Corporation predicted minor impacts, and attempted to measure the impact of the 2017 eclipse. In California, solar power was projected to decrease by 4–6,000 megawatts at 70 MW/minute, and then ramp up by 90 MW/minute as the shadow passes. CAISO's typical ramp rate is 29 megawatts per minute. Around 4 GW mainly in North Carolina and Georgia were expected to be 90 percent obscured.

After the 2017 eclipse, grid operators in California reported having lost 3,000–3,500 megawatts of utility-scale solar power, which was made up for by hydropower and gas reliably and as expected, mimicking the usual duck curve. Energy demand management was also used to mitigate the solar drop, and NEST customers reduced their demand by 700 MW.

NV Energy prepared for the solar eclipse months in advance and collaborated with 17 western states. When the eclipse began covering California with partial darkness, which reduced its usual amount of solar-generated electricity, NV Energy sent power there. Likewise, when Nevada received less sunlight, other west coast states supplied electricity to it. During the solar eclipse, the state of Nevada lost about 450 megawatts of electricity, the amount used by about a quarter million typical residences.

The 2015 eclipse caused manageable solar power decreases in Europe; in Germany, solar power dropped from 14 GW to 7 GW, of a 38 GW solar power capacity.

Commemorative stamp

On June 20, 2017, the USPS released the first application of thermochromic ink to postage stamps in its Total Eclipse of the Sun Forever stamp to commemorate the eclipse. When pressed with a finger, body heat turns the dark image into an image of the full moon. The stamp was released prior to August 21, so uses an image from the eclipse of March 29, 2006 seen in Jalu, Libya.

Videos

Gallery

Totality
(Images where the sun is completely eclipsed by the moon)

Transition
(Images showing Baily's beads or a Diamond ring, which occur just as totality begins or ends)

Partial
(Images where the sun is partially eclipsed by the moon)

Images produced by natural pinholes
(Images of the eclipse created by natural pinholes formed by tree leaves)

Views outside of the US

Related eclipses
Occurring only 3.2 days after perigee (Perigee on Friday, August 18, 2017), the moon's apparent diameter was larger during the total solar eclipse on Monday, August 21, 2017.

There was another solar eclipse in 2017, a large annular solar eclipse (99.223%) on February 26.

Eclipses of 2017
 A penumbral lunar eclipse on February 11.
 An annular solar eclipse on February 26.
 A partial lunar eclipse on August 7.
 A total solar eclipse on August 21.

Solar eclipses ascending node 2015–2018 

 Saros 125: Partial Solar Eclipse September 13, 2015
 Saros 135: Annular Solar Eclipse September 1, 2016
 Saros 145: Total Solar Eclipse August 21, 2017
 Saros 155: Partial Solar Eclipse August 11, 2018

Astronomers Without Borders began collecting eclipse glasses for redistribution to Latin America for the total solar eclipse occurring on July 2, 2019, and to Asia for the annular eclipse on December 26, 2019.

A partial lunar eclipse took place on August 7, 2017, in the same eclipse season. It was visible over Africa, Asia, Australia, and eastern Europe.

Tzolkinex
 Preceded: Solar eclipse of July 11, 2010
 Followed: Solar eclipse of October 2, 2024

Half-Saros cycle
 Preceded: Lunar eclipse of August 16, 2008
 Followed: Lunar eclipse of August 28, 2026

Tritos
 Preceded: Solar eclipse of September 22, 2006
 Followed: Solar eclipse of July 22, 2028

Solar Saros 145
 Preceded: Solar eclipse of August 11, 1999
 Followed: Solar eclipse of September 2, 2035

Inex
 Preceded: Solar eclipse of September 11, 1988
 Followed: Solar eclipse of August 2, 2046

Solar eclipses 2015–2018

Saros series 145

Inex series

Metonic series

See also

 List of solar eclipses visible from the United States

Notable total solar eclipses crossing the United States from 1900 to 2050:
 Solar eclipse of June 8, 1918 (Saros 126, Descending Node)
 Solar eclipse of September 10, 1923 (Saros 143, Ascending Node)
 Solar eclipse of January 24, 1925 (Saros 120, Descending Node)
 Solar eclipse of August 31, 1932 (Saros 124, Descending Node)
 Solar eclipse of July 9, 1945 (Saros 145, Ascending Node)
 Solar eclipse of June 30, 1954 (Saros 126, Descending Node)
 Solar eclipse of October 2, 1959 (Saros 143, Ascending Node)
 Solar eclipse of July 20, 1963 (Saros 145, Ascending Node)
 Solar eclipse of March 7, 1970 (Saros 139, Ascending Node)
 Solar eclipse of February 26, 1979 (Saros 120, Descending Node)
 Solar eclipse of August 21, 2017 (Saros 145, Ascending Node)
 Solar eclipse of April 8, 2024 (Saros 139, Ascending Node)
 Solar eclipse of August 12, 2045 (Saros 136, Descending Node)

Notable annular solar eclipses crossing the United States from 1900 to 2050:
 Solar eclipse of May 30, 1984 (Saros 137, Ascending Node)
 Solar eclipse of May 10, 1994 (Saros 128, Descending Node)
 Solar eclipse of October 14, 2023 (Saros 134, Descending Node)
 Solar eclipse of June 11, 2048 (Saros 128, Descending Node)

References

Further reading

External links

 August 21, 2017 eclipse – NASA
 Color map – NASA
 Eclipse 2017: One Nation Under The Sun (NPR) A synopsis of people's reactions as the eclipse moved across the U.S., (published August 27, 2017).
 Eclipse Across America (Celestron) A synopsis of people's reactions as the eclipse moved across the U.S., (published September 26, 2017).
 Photos and videos Space.com
 Gallery of photos from Casper, Wyoming
 NationalEclipse.com An educational site launched for the 2017 eclipse with overviews, maps, city data, events, animations, merchandise, historical information, and other resources.

2017 in science
2017 in space
2017 08 21
Articles containing video clips
August 2017 events
August 2017 events in the United States
2017 08 21